Georges Daux (21 September 1899 – 23 December 1988) was a French archaeologist and a leading scholar of Greek inscriptions.

Born in Bastia and educated at the École normale supérieure, Daux headed the French School at Athens from 1950 to 1969.

He was elected to the American Philosophical Society in 1953, Académie des Inscriptions et Belles-Lettres in 1971, and to the British Academy in 1975.

References 

1899 births
1988 deaths
French archaeologists
French hellenists
French epigraphers
École Normale Supérieure alumni
Members of the Académie des Inscriptions et Belles-Lettres
Corresponding Fellows of the British Academy
Members of the American Philosophical Society
Commandeurs of the Légion d'honneur
Academic staff of the University of Paris
Academic staff of the University of Burgundy
French Army personnel